Anvar Imanaliyevich Ibragimgadzhiyev (born 27 September 1991) is a former Russian professional football player.

Career
Anvar Ibragimgadzhiyev made his professional debut for Anzhi Makhachkala on 14 July 2010 in the Russian Cup game against FC Pskov-747 Pskov.

He made his Russian Football National League debut for FC Khimki on 22 August 2012 in a game against FC Ufa.

External links
 
 Career summary by sportbox.ru
 

1991 births
Russian people of Dagestani descent
People from Dagestan
Living people
Russian footballers
Association football defenders
FC Anzhi Makhachkala players
FC Khimki players
FC Zimbru Chișinău players
Moldovan Super Liga players
Russian expatriate footballers
Expatriate footballers in Moldova
Sportspeople from Dagestan